Jakub Kiełb (born 15 July 1993) is a Polish professional footballer who plays as a left-back for Warta Poznań.

Career

On 7 February 2019, during a 2–0 win over Widzew Łódź, Kiełb earned a penalty for Warta Poznań with the score still at 0-0, but admitted that he was not fouled, causing the decision to be overturned and earning a fair play award.

References

External links
 Jakub Kiełb at 90minut

Polish footballers
Living people
1993 births
Association football defenders
People from Jarocin
UKS SMS Łódź players
Tur Turek players
ŁKS Łódź players
Bruk-Bet Termalica Nieciecza players
Chrobry Głogów players
Jarota Jarocin players
Warta Poznań players
Ekstraklasa players
I liga players
II liga players
III liga players